The Hanover Bank Building or Hanover National Bank Building was an early skyscraper at the southwest corner of Pine Street and Nassau Street in Lower Manhattan, New York City. It was built in 1901-1903 and demolished in 1931.

History 
Construction of the Hanover Bank Building began in 1901 and was completed in 1903. It was next to the Banker's Trust Building on 14 Wall Street. The building, like many of its contemporaries, was built in neoclassical style, richly decorated.

Bankers Trust acquired the building in 1929, and it was demolished in 1931 to make way for the expansion of 14 Wall.

References

External links

 https://www.nyc-architecture.com/GON/GON014.htm
 https://www.nyc-architecture.com/GON/GON073.htm
 Emporis.com

1903 establishments in New York City
1931 disestablishments in New York (state)
Buildings and structures demolished in 1931
Commercial buildings completed in 1903
Commercial buildings in Manhattan
Demolished buildings and structures in Manhattan
Financial District, Manhattan